Gordon John Smith (born November 17, 1949) is a Canadian former ice hockey player. He is the older brother of former New York Islanders goaltender Billy Smith.

Career 
Originally selected by the New York Rangers in the 1969 NHL Entry Draft, he played his first NHL game with the Washington Capitals after the 1974 NHL Expansion Draft. Smith spent five seasons with the Capitals before he was claimed by the Winnipeg Jets in the 1979 NHL Expansion Draft.

Career statistics

Regular season and playoffs

External links
 
 Profile at hockeydraftcentral.com

1949 births
Living people
Canadian ice hockey defencemen
Hershey Bears players
Ice hockey people from Ontario
Maine Mariners players
New Haven Blades players
New Haven Nighthawks players
New York Rangers draft picks
Omaha Knights (CHL) players
People from Perth, Ontario
Richmond Robins players
Springfield Indians players
Springfield Kings players
Tulsa Oilers (1964–1984) players
Washington Capitals players
Winnipeg Jets (1979–1996) players